Armando Romero Manríquez (27 October 1960 – 24 December 2020) was a Mexican professional footballer who played as a midfielder.

Career
Born in Mexico City, played for Veracruz, Cruz Azul, Toluca, Cobras, Correcaminos UAT, Marte and Zacatepec. He captained Cruz Azul.

He played for Mexico at under-20 level, representing them at the 1979 FIFA World Youth Championship, and later earned 5 caps for the senior team.

Later life and death
He died of COVID-19 complications at age 60, during the COVID-19 pandemic in Mexico.

References

1960 births
2020 deaths
Mexican footballers
Mexico international footballers
Mexico under-20 international footballers
C.D. Veracruz footballers
Cruz Azul footballers
Deportivo Toluca F.C. players
Club de Fútbol Cobras players
Correcaminos UAT footballers
Atlético Morelia players
Atlético Zacatepec footballers
Liga MX players
Association football midfielders
Deaths from the COVID-19 pandemic in Mexico